Diamond City was a settlement on the eastern end of Shackleford Banks, in Carteret County, North Carolina, United States.

Due to the San Ciriaco hurricane that struck in August 1899, the approximately 500 residents of the settlement and island decided to move.  The last of the residents had left by 1902, and even relocated houses to nearby places such as Harkers Island, Salter Path and Morehead City.

Shackleford Banks is the westernmost island of the Cape Lookout National Seashore, which extends for 56 miles from Beaufort Inlet to Ocracoke Inlet.

There are no bridges from the mainland to the site where Diamond City was located or any other part of the Cape Lookout National Seashore.  Visitors must ride a private boat or a passenger ferry to reach the undeveloped Shackleford Banks site.

Whaling 

Cape Lookout and the Shackleford Banks in North Carolina were the sites of the only shore-based whaling stations on the Eastern United States south of New York.  These locations were ideal for whaling because they were close to the Gulf Stream, which was near the migration path of North Atlantic right and sperm whales.  Between Cape Lookout and Shackleford Banks was the settlement of Diamond City, the largest town in the area with a permanent population of around 500.

Further reading
Interview With Dorothy Guthrie At Harkers Island, North Carolina
Cape Lookout National Seashore

References 

Geography of Carteret County, North Carolina
Ghost towns in North Carolina
Whaling stations
Whaling in the United States